The 2022–23 Tala'ea El Gaish SC season is the club's 26th season in existence and the 19th consecutive season in the top flight of Egyptian football. In addition to the domestic league, Tala'ea El Gaish will participate in this season's editions of the Egypt Cup, the EFA Cup and the Arab Club Champions Cup.

Players

First-team squad

Transfers

In

Out

Pre-season and friendlies

Competitions

Overview

Egyptian Premier League

League table

Results summary

Results by round

Matches 
The league fixtures were announced on 9 October 2022.

Egypt Cup

EFA Cup

Arab Club Champions Cup

Qualifying rounds

References

Tala'ea El Gaish SC
Tala'ea El Gaish
2022 in African football
2023 in African football